Netball in Samoa is a popular game, usually played by girls on Saturdays during the winter, though games can be played at all times of the year. The sport started to grow in popularity during the 1970s. The popularity of netball is also growing amongst men on the island.

International competition
Samoa and Fiji are traditional netball rivals.  This rivalry can be seen at events like Pacific Games.

As of August 2016, the women's national team was ranked fourteen in the world.

Samoa has a men's national team that has competed in the 2009 and 2011 International Challenge Men's and Mixed Netball Tournament.

At Gay Games VI, a transgender netball from Samoa competed.

Notable players
Rita Fatialofa is a Samoan netball player, who later went on to compete on New Zealand's national team. She became the coach for the Samoan national team, qualifying them for every Pacific Games, as well as 1991 and 1995 Netball World Championships. Cathrine Latu is another famous Samoan player who went on to play for New Zealand.

References

Bibliography

External links 
Oceania Sport